The 2004 Women's Four Nations Hockey Tournament was a women's field hockey tournament, consisting of a series of test matches. It was held in Córdoba, Argentina, from February 11 to 15, 2004, and featured four of the top nations in women's field hockey.

Competition format
The tournament featured the national teams of Germany, the Netherlands, South Korea, and the hosts, Argentina, competing in a round-robin format, with each team playing each other once. Three points were awarded for a win, one for a draw, and none for a loss.

Officials
The following umpires were appointed by the International Hockey Federation to officiate the tournament:

Stella Bartlema (NED)
Cristina Ferrario (ARG)
Christiane Hippler (GER)
Kim Myung-Ok (KOR)
Gina Spitaleri (ITA)

Results
All times are local (Argentina Standard Time).

Preliminary round

Fixtures

Classification round

Third and fourth place

Final

Statistics

Final standings

Goalscorers

References

External links
Official website

2004 in women's field hockey
International women's field hockey competitions hosted by Argentina
Sport in Córdoba, Argentina
February 2004 sports events in South America